Falsepilysta ochraceomaculata is a species of beetle in the family Cerambycidae. It was described by Schwarzer in 1931.

References

Apomecynini
Beetles described in 1931